Marc James Wootton (born 8 February 1975) is an English actor, comedian and writer, best known for his role as Mr Poppy in the Nativity! film series. He also starred in the TV series High Spirits with Shirley Ghostman, La La Land, Nighty Night and voiced Max in Counterfeit Cat.

Career 
Wootton made early television appearances on the Channel 4 comedy show The Eleven O'Clock Show and BBC Three's Cyderdelic, E4 comedy The Pilot Show and the BBC Two sitcom Thin Ice. His breakthrough role came with the Channel 4 comedy gameshow My New Best Friend, in which contestants had to convince their closest friends and relatives that a series of awful characters (played by Wootton) were their new best friend, for a prize of £10,000. He then wrote and starred in the BBC Three sketch show Marc Wootton Exposed, the first series of which started on 13 January and finished on 25 February 2008.

His regular character Shirley Ghostman, a parody of TV psychics such as Derek Acorah  and Colin Fry, was spun off into her own series, High Spirits with Shirley Ghostman, for BBC Three. However, the series was shelved after an in-character appearance by Wootton on Friday Night with Jonathan Ross, during which he made a number of jokes referencing "Jews, cancer patients and Hitler". The BBC apologised after receiving over 350 complaints.

Ghostman returned, along with other characters, in Wootton's six-part show La La Land. The series premiered on the Showtime USA network on 25 January 2010 and premiered on BBC Three on 27 April 2010. In 2018 Wootton wrote and starred in the six part comedy series High & Dry  for Channel 4 in the UK, which debuted on the station on 4 May 2018.

Collaborations

Wotton played the role of softly spoken dating agent Gary Furze (Lasso The Moon agency) in the first series of Julia Davis' Nighty Night. In the second series he played Dennis, Linda's aggressive husband. Wootton collaborated with Julia Davis again in the semi-improvised character comedy Couples, for BBC Radio 4. In 2014, he starred in the first episode of the comedy anthology seriesInside No 9, "Sardines". 

In 2006, Wootton appeared in the Debbie Isitt film Confetti as a best man, Snoopy. In 2009 he starred in Isitt's Christmas comedy film Nativity, a role he reprised in the sequel, Nativity 2: Danger in the Manger, released in November 2012.

Filmography

Theatre 
Season's Greetings as Eddie – National Theatre (2010–2011)
A Midsummer Night's Dream as Nick Bottom – Royal Shakespeare Theatre – Royal Shakespeare Company (2011)
    The Same Deep Water As Me as Kevin Needleman – Donmar Warehouse (1 August – 28 September 2013)
    Bull – The Young Vic (2015–2016)

Radio
 And The Winner Is hosted by Matt Lucas, Panellist BBC Radio 2 (2011)
 Date Night, BBC Radio 4 (2019)

Awards
Rose D'or Golden Rose Award Best Gameshow, 2004 My New Best Friend (2004)
British Comedy Award Best New TV Comedy My New Best Friend (2003)
BBC Two Greenlight Award Cyderdelic (2003)

References

External links 
 Marc Wootton official site titled "Fooling Nobody"
 

1975 births
Living people
20th-century English male actors
21st-century English male actors
English male comedians
English male film actors
English male television actors
Male actors from Portsmouth
Writers from Portsmouth